Methanococcus is a genus of coccoid methanogens of the family Methanococcaceae. They are all mesophiles, except the thermophilic M. thermolithotrophicus and the hyperthermophilic M. jannaschii. The latter was discovered at the base of a “white smoker” chimney at 21°N on the East Pacific Rise and it was the first archaeal genome to be completely sequenced, revealing many novel and eukaryote-like elements.

Phylogeny
The currently accepted taxonomy is based on the List of Prokaryotic names with Standing in Nomenclature (LPSN)  and National Center for Biotechnology Information (NCBI).

See also
 List of Archaea genera

References

Further reading

Scientific journals

Scientific books

Scientific databases

External links

Archaea genera
Euryarchaeota